Nasukawa (written: 那須川) is a Japanese surname. Notable people with the surname include:

, Japanese footballer
, Japanese long-distance runner
, Japanese kickboxer

Japanese-language surnames